Sunovion Pharmaceuticals Inc. (former NASDAQ: SEPR), known until October 12, 2010 as Sepracor, Inc. prior to its acquisition by Sumitomo Pharma of Japan, is a pharmaceutical company founded in 1984 by Timothy J. Barberich, Steve Matson, and Bob Bratzler. It was originally located in Princeton, New Jersey and then re-located to Marlborough, Massachusetts. In addition to its headquarters in Marlborough, Sunovion has locations in Mississauga, Ontario, and Teaneck, New Jersey.

Company history
The company's initial focus was on the separation and purification of isomers and active metabolites. Sepracor completed its initial public offering in 1991 at a market cap of $160M, behind a strategy of presenting larger pharmaceuticals with patented, purified active ingredients for expiring products. In 1993, Marion Merrell Dow, now a part of Sanofi, partnered with Sepracor to develop a purified version of its antihistamine, Seldane, after the latter was required to carry a warning about potentially fatal cardiac arrhythmia. This purified compound would later be marketed as Allegra, but Sepracor would not profit significantly from its launch, a result of less-than favorable partnership terms.

Sepracor's subsequent products were focused on the treatment of central nervous system and respiratory disorders, under the direction of Gunnar Aberg and John McCullough. The primary source of its revenue in the late 1990s - early 2000s was the approximately $600 million annually from its Xopenex franchise of drugs. The insomnia drug Lunesta (eszopiclone) was approved by the US Food and Drug Administration (FDA) in December 2004 and launched in April 2005. In 2006, the FDA approved Sepracor's drug Brovana to treat chronic obstructive pulmonary disease (COPD).

Acquisition by Sumitomo Dainippon Pharma
Sepracor was acquired by then-Sumitomo Dainippon Pharma in 2010 for $2.6B. Sepracor would become an indirect, wholly owned subsidiary of Dainippon Sumitomo Pharma and renamed to Sunovion.

Sunovion's History

In 2008, Bial agreed with then-Sepracor to produce and market its antiepileptic Aptiom at Sepracor's facilities and supervised by Bial. Aptiom subsequently received FDA approval in 2013 to treat partial onset seizures.

In 2010, Latuda, an atypical antipsychotic, received FDA approval for the treatment of schizophrenia and in 2013, received a secondary approval for the treatment of depressive episodes associated with Bipolar I Disorder.

Products Under Development
 Ulotaront (SEP-856) – phase III
 Aramisulpride:esamisulpride (85:15 ratio) (SEP-4199) – phase III

List of mergers and acquisitions
The following is an illustration of the company's major mergers and acquisitions and historical predecessors:

Sunovion (Previously-known as Sepracor)
 IBF Biotechnics (Acq 1991)
 New England Pharmaceuticals (Acq 1995)
 Oryx Pharmaceuticals (Acq 2008)
 Elevation Pharmaceuticals (Acq 2012)
 Cynapsus Therapeutics (Acq 2016)

References

External links
Sunovion Pharmaceuticals, Inc.

Companies formerly listed on the Nasdaq
Biotechnology companies of the United States
Companies based in Middlesex County, Massachusetts
Marlborough, Massachusetts
Pharmaceutical companies established in 1984